José da Costa Campos (Pangim, August 9, 1801 - June 7, 1862) was a military man and Portuguese colonial administrator. He was a member of the traditional Costa Campos Portuguese-Goan family, son of Hermenegildo da Costa Campos, field marshal of the Portuguese army in Portuguese India, and Dona Mariana Águia Pereira de Lacerda, of Daman. He was the brother of Luís da Costa Campos, member of the Council of State Government of Portuguese India in 1855, and familiar to many rulers of this former Portuguese state.

He formed the 19th Governing Council of Portuguese India following the death of Manoel José Mendes, the Barão de Candal, in 1840.

References

Governors-General of Portuguese India
Portuguese military personnel
1801 births
1862 deaths
19th-century Portuguese people